Léon Duguit (1859–1928) was a leading French scholar of public law (droit public). After a stint at Caen from 1882 to 1886, he was appointed to a chair of constitutional law at the University of Bordeaux in 1892, where one of his colleagues was Émile Durkheim.

Duguit's novel objectivist theory of public law, developed in amicable rivalry with his colleague Maurice Hauriou of Toulouse, was to have a lasting effect on the development of these parts of law. In Duguit's opinion, the state was not a mythical Sovereign inherently superior to all its subjects, or even a particularly powerful legal person, but merely a group of people engaged in public service, the activity constituting and legitimising the state. Although critical of notions such as sovereignty, democracy, legal personhood and even property to the extent it is not legitimised by a social purpose, he distinguished himself from Marxists by emphasizing the function of the economy for the development of the state.

Works 

 L'État, le droit objectif et la loi positive.  Extracted as "Theory of Objective Law Anterior to the State" in Modern French Legal Philosophy, trans. Mrs Franklin W. Scott and Joseph P. Chamberlain (New York, Kelly, 1916;  South Hackensack NJ, Rothman,  1968), pp. 235-344
 L'État les gouvernants et les agents
 Souveraineté et liberté
 Les transformations du droit public
 Traité de droit constitutionnel
 
 
    Translated by Margaret Grandgent and Ralph W. Gifford.

References
 
 

Notes

1859 births
1928 deaths
People from Libourne
University of Bordeaux alumni
Academic staff of the University of Bordeaux
French international relations scholars
French jurists